Kevin Bernard Caton (born 10 May 1965) is a retired Australian rules footballer who played in the VFL/AFL for the West Coast Eagles, Fitzroy and Brisbane Bears.

References

1965 births
Living people
Australian rules footballers from the Northern Territory
Indigenous Australian players of Australian rules football
West Coast Eagles players
Fitzroy Football Club players
Brisbane Bears players
Swan Districts Football Club players
Darwin Football Club players